The 1980–81 season was Newport County's first season back in the Third Division since relegation in 1962 and their 53rd season overall in the Football League.

The club finished a credible 12th in the Third Division but this season was all about County's first European competition, the UEFA Cup Winners' Cup.

Season review

Results summary

Results by round

Fixtures and results

Third Division

European Cup Winners' Cup

FA Cup

Football League Cup

Welsh Cup

League table

External links
 Newport County 1980-1981 : Results
 Newport County football club match record: 1981
 WELSH CUP 1980/81

1980-81
English football clubs 1980–81 season
Welsh football clubs 1980–81 season